Johannesburg is the largest city in South Africa. Its local government is the City of Johannesburg Metropolitan Municipality.

Johannesburg may also refer to:

Places in the United States
Johannesburg, California
Johannesburg, Michigan
Johannesburg, Wisconsin
Johannesburg Mountain, Washington

Music
Johannesburg (EP), a 2016 EP by Mumford and Sons
A 1975 single by Gil Scott-Heron

Other
Johannesburg Declaration, enacted in 2002
Johannesburg (horse) (born 1999), a racehorse from Kentucky

See also
Schloss Johannesburg (disambiguation) (Castle Johannesburg)
Johannesberg (disambiguation)
Johannisberg (disambiguation)
Johannisburg (disambiguation)
Witwatersrand